Comedy may be divided into multiple genres based on the source of humor, the method of delivery, and the context in which it is delivered.
These classifications overlap, and most comedians can fit into multiple genres. For example, deadpan comics often fall into observational comedy, or into black comedy or blue comedy to contrast the morbidity, or offensiveness of the joke with a lack of emotion.

References